The Tomb of Salim Chishti is famed as one of the finest examples of Mughal architecture in India, built during the years 1580 and 1581, along with the imperial complex at Fatehpur Sikri near Zenana Rauza and facing south towards Buland Darwaza, within the quadrangle of the Jama Masjid which measures 350 ft. by 440 ft. It enshrines the burial place of the Sufi saint, Salim Chisti (1478 – 1572), a descendant of Khwaja Moinuddin Chishti of Ajmer, and who lived in a cavern on the ridge at Sikri. The mausoleum, constructed by Akbar as a mark of his respect for the Sufi saint, who foretold the birth of Akbar's son, who was named as Prince Salim after the Sufi Saint and later jahangir succeeded Akbar to the throne of the Mughal Empire,

Architecture

The tomb has been constructed on a platform that is about 1 m. high, a flight of five steps leading to the entrance portico. The main tomb building is enclosed by delicate marble screens on all sides, and the tomb is located in the centre of the main hall, which has a single semi-circular dome. The marble building is beautifully carved and has an ivory-like appearance. The plinth is ornamented with mosaics of black and yellow marble arranged in geometric patterns. An ebony "chhaparkhat" enclosure surrounds the marble cenotaph, which is usually covered by a green cloth. A wooden canopy incrusted with mother-of-pearl inlay mosaic over it.

The door to the main chamber is intricately carved with arabesque patterns and bears inscriptions from the Quran. Brown marble borders the interior bays while the relief panels - with the Quran verses - have a blue background. The carved and painted tomb chamber has a white marble floor, which is inlaid with multicolored stones. The multicoloured stones which are also a piece of diamond ruby or emreld.

Gallery

References

External links

Salim Chishti's tomb (Outside), 360 degree view
Tomb of Sheikh Salim Chishti

Dargahs in India
Fatehpur Sikri
Mausoleums in Uttar Pradesh
Tourist attractions in Agra
Buildings and structures in Agra district
Chishti Order
Sufi shrines in India